STKRJ Tungku Area 2 is a public housing estate and village within Mukim Gadong 'A' in Brunei-Muara District, Brunei. The population was 1,862 in 2016. The postcode is BE2519. It is one of the estates for the Landless Indigenous Citizens' Housing Scheme (STKRJ), the public housing programme for the country's indigenous citizens.

Geography 
As a village subdivision, it borders Kampong Tungku to the north, south and west, and STKRJ Kampong Rimba to the east.

It is one of the STKRJ estates named after the nearby village Kampong Tungku.

See also 
 STKRJ Tungku Area 1
 Kampong Tungku
 STKRJ Kampong Katok 'A'

References 

Public housing estates in Brunei
Villages in Brunei-Muara District